The Americas Zone is one of the three zones of the regional Davis Cup competition in 2017.

In the Americas Zone there are three different tiers, called groups, in which teams compete against each other to advance to the upper tier. Winners in Group II advance to the Americas Zone Group I. Teams who lose their respective ties will compete in the relegation play-offs, with winning teams remaining in Group II, whereas teams who lose their play-offs will be relegated to the Americas Zone Group III in 2018.

Participating nations

Seeds: 

Remaining nations:

Draw

 and  relegated to Group III in 2018.
 promoted to Group I in 2018.

First round

Paraguay vs. Barbados

Guatemala vs. Mexico

El Salvador vs. Bolivia

Venezuela vs. Bahamas

Second round

Barbados vs. Guatemala

Venezuela vs. El Salvador

Play-offs

Mexico vs. Paraguay

Bolivia vs. Bahamas

Third round

Barbados vs. Venezuela

References

External links
Official Website

Americas Zone Group II
Davis Cup Americas Zone